The Cross Subdivision is a railroad line owned by CSX Transportation in the U.S. State of South Carolina. At its east end the line continues west from the Charleston Subdivision and at its west end the track comes to an end.

See also
 List of CSX Transportation lines

References

CSX Transportation lines
Rail infrastructure in South Carolina